Water polo was contested for men only at the 1993 Central American and Caribbean Games in Ponce, Puerto Rico.

References
 

1993 Central American and Caribbean Games
1993
1993 in water polo